The 1986 Pittsburgh Steelers season was the franchise’s 54th season as a professional sports franchise and as a member of the National Football League. The Steelers failed to improve upon their 7–9 record from 1985: they instead finished 6–10 and failed to reach the playoffs for a second consecutive season.

Personnel

Staff

Roster

Offseason

Preseason

Schedule

Regular season

Schedule

Week 1: at Seattle Seahawks

Week 2 vs. Denver Broncos

Week 3: at Minnesota Vikings

Week 4: at Houston Oilers

Week 5: vs. Cleveland Browns

This was Cleveland’s first win in Pittsburgh since 1969.

Week 6: at Cincinnati Bengals

Week 7: vs. New England Patriots

Week 8: vs. Cincinnati Bengals

Week 9: vs. Green Bay Packers

Week 10: at Buffalo Bills

Week 11: vs. Houston Oilers

Week 12: at Cleveland Browns

Week 13: at Chicago Bears

Week 14: vs. Detroit Lions

Week 15 at Jets

Week 16: vs. Kansas City Chiefs

Standings

References

External links
 1986 Pittsburgh Steelers season at Profootballreference.com 
 1986 Pittsburgh Steelers season statistics at jt-sw.com 

Pittsburgh Steelers seasons
Pittsburgh Steelers
Pittsburgh Steelers season